Richard Alan Garcés Mendoza, Jr. [gar-CESS] (born May 18, 1971) is a former right-handed relief pitcher in Major League Baseball. Nicknamed "El Guapo" (The handsome one), he played with the Minnesota Twins (1990, 1993), Chicago Cubs (1995), Florida Marlins (1995) and Boston Red Sox (1996–2002). In 2017 he was the pitching coach for the Bridgeport Bluefish, and as of 2022 he is working with the CT Mets as their Pitching Coordinator.

Career
Garces was signed by Minnesota as an amateur free agent in 1987. After stints with the Twins, Cubs and Marlins, he pitched for the Red Sox, turning into one of the American League's premier setup men. He quickly became a favorite among Red Sox fans, as much for his large size as his performance. His weight was listed at 215 lbs, although it is widely believed to have been significantly higher. The Red Sox asked Garcés to lose weight over an off-season, which he did. His numbers were never the same after that, however, leading many to believe the drastic weight loss negatively affected his mechanics.

In 1999, Garcés posted a 5–1 record with 33 strikeouts, a 1.55 earned run average, and two saves. This was followed with a mark of 8–1, 69 SO, 3.25 ERA, and one save in 2000.

Although only 31 years old in 2002, Garcés' performance displayed a much-weakened arm strength. After his disappointing ERA of 7.59 in 21 innings, he was released by Boston.  On January 22, 2003, he signed with the Colorado Rockies as a free agent, but he was released in March 2003 before the regular season started.

In a ten-year career, Garcés compiled a 23–10 record with a 3.74 ERA, seven saves, 53 holds, 296 strikeouts, 164 walks, and  innings pitched in 287 games, holding opponents to a .227 batting average.

In June 2005, Garcés signed a minor league contract with the Red Sox, pitched in the Gulf Coast League for the Gulf Coast Red Sox. He was released in October 2005.  

Garcés played for the Venezuelan Professional Winter League in 2006, finishing 3–1 with 11 saves and a 2.31 ERA in 24 appearances for the Aguilas del Zulia. Based on this performance, Garcés signed a contract in February 2007 to pitch for the Nashua Pride (of the independent Can-Am League) with the hope of working his way back to the major leagues. He served as a relief pitcher for the Pride in 2007 and 2008.

See also
 List of Major League Baseball players from Venezuela

References

External links
, or Retrosheet, or Pura Pelota (Venezuelan League)

1971 births
Living people
Águilas del Zulia players
Boston Red Sox players
Chicago Cubs players
Elizabethton Twins players
Florida Marlins players
Gulf Coast Red Sox players
Iowa Cubs players
Kenosha Twins players
Lowell Spinners players
Major League Baseball pitchers
Major League Baseball players from Venezuela
Mexican League baseball pitchers
Minnesota Twins players
Minor league baseball coaches
Nashua Pride players
Nashville Xpress players
Navegantes del Magallanes players
Orlando Sun Rays players
Pawtucket Red Sox players
Sportspeople from Maracay
Portland Beavers players
Potros de Tijuana players
Tigres de Aragua players
Visalia Oaks players
Venezuelan baseball coaches
Venezuelan expatriate baseball players in Mexico
Venezuelan expatriate baseball players in the United States